Soubise can refer to:

 Soubise, a salpicon of cooked and pureed rice and onions; used primarily "au gratin". (steaks, tournedos)
 Soubise sauce, based on Béchamel sauce, with the addition of a soubise of onion and rice purée
 Soubise, Charente-Maritime, a commune of the Charente-Maritime département, in France
 Benjamin, Duke of Soubise (? 1580-1642), Huguenot leader
 Charles, Prince of Soubise (1715–1787), peer and Marshal of France
 Julius Soubise (1754–1798), freed Afro-Caribbean slave and noted British fop
 Prince of Soubise
 Princess of Soubise
 Hôtel de Soubise, a Parisian mansion that hosts the Museum of French History and a part of the French National Archives